Devon and East Plymouth was a European Parliament constituency covering all of Devon in England, with the exception of the city of Plymouth. It was created in 1994 to replace the majority of Devon and a small part of Cornwall and Plymouth.

Prior to its uniform adoption of proportional representation in 1999, the United Kingdom used first-past-the-post for the European elections in England, Scotland and Wales. The European Parliament constituencies used under that system were smaller than the later regional constituencies and only had one Member of the European Parliament each.

The constituency consisted of the Westminster Parliament constituencies (on their 1983 boundaries) of Exeter, Plymouth Sutton, South Hams, Teignbridge, Tiverton, Torbay and Torridge and West Devon.

The seat became part of the much larger South West England constituency in 1999.

Members of the European Parliament

Results 
Only one election was held in the seat, in 1994. When nominations closed, it was revealed that Richard Huggett was a candidate with the description "Literal Democrat", a name very similar to that of the Liberal Democrats. The latter launched legal action in the High Court of Justice alleging that the Returning Officer had wrongly accepted a nomination which was designed to confuse voters. The Judge ruled that the nomination had to stand. Huggett won more than 10,000 votes, while Liberal Democrat candidate Adrian Sanders finished only 700 votes behind the winner. This prompted a change in the law, banning potentially confusing party descriptions.

References

External links

 David Boothroyd's United Kingdom Election Results 

European Parliament constituencies in England (1979–1999)
Politics of Cornwall
Politics of Plymouth, Devon
1994 establishments in England
1999 disestablishments in England
Constituencies established in 1994
Constituencies disestablished in 1999